Shin-young, also spelled Shin-yong or Sin-young, is a Korean unisex given name. Its meaning depends on the hanja used to write each syllable of the name. There are 25 hanja with the reading "shin" and 34 hanja with the reading "young" on the South Korean government's official list of hanja which may be registered for use in given names.

People with this name include:
Lho Shin-yong (born 1930), South Korean male politician, Prime Minister from 1985 to 1987
Park Sin-yeong (born 1942), South Korean male rower
Kang Sin-young (born 1977), South Korean female judo practitioner
Kim Shin-young (footballer) (born 1983), South Korean male football striker (J League, K-League Classic)
Jang Shin-young (born 1984), South Korean actress
Kim Shin-young (born 1984), South Korean female comedian and TV host
Yoon Sin-young (born 1987), South Korean male football defender (J2 League)
Yang Shin-young (born 1990), South Korean female short track skater
Bae Shin-young (born 1992), South Korean male football striker (K-League Challenge)

Fictional characters with this name include:
Lee Shin-young, in 2010 South Korean television series The Woman Who Still Wants to Marry

See also
List of Korean given names

References

Korean unisex given names